The 1986 American Racing Series Championship consisted of 10 races and was the inaugural season for the series. Fabrizio Barbazza won five races on his way to the championship.

Calendar

Race summaries

Phoenix race 1
Held April 6 at Phoenix International Raceway. Kim Campbell won the pole. This was the first race for the series.

Top Five Results
5- Steve Millen
3- Cary Bren
12- Fabrizio Barbazza
8- Billy Boat
85- Jeff Andretti

Milwaukee race
Held June 8 at The Milwaukee Mile. Jeff Andretti won the pole.

Top Five Results
20- Mike Groff
1- Jerrill Rice
85- Jeff Andretti
5- Steve Millen
10- Stan Fox

Meadowlands race
Held June 29 at the Meadowlands Sports Complex. Fabrizio Barbazza won the pole.

Top Five Results
12- Fabrizio Barbazza
4- Tommy Byrne
2- Steve Bren
1- Jerrill Rice
14- Brad Murphey

Toronto race
Held July 20 at Exhibition Place. Fabrizio Barbazza won the pole.

Top Five Results
12- Fabrizio Barbazza
20- Mike Groff
3- Cary Bren
9- John Graham
8- Sammy Swindell

Pocono race
Held August 16 at Pocono Raceway. Jeff Andretti won the pole.

Top Five Results
85- Jeff Andretti
20- Mike Groff
59- Nick Fornoro Jr.
4- Tommy Byrne
7- Sammy Swindell

Mid-Ohio race
Held August 31 at The Mid-Ohio Sports Car Course. Steve Millen won the pole.

Top Five Results
10- Steve Millen
12- Fabrizio Barbazza
15- Ross Cheever
85- Jeff Andretti
8- Billy Boat

Elkhart Lake race
Held September 20 at Road America. Juan Manuel Fangio II won the pole.

Top Five Results
20- Mike Groff
85- Jeff Andretti
9- Tommy Byrne
15- Ross Cheever
2- Gary Rubio

Laguna Seca race
Held October 12 at Mazda Raceway Laguna Seca. Tommy Byrne won the pole.

Top Five Results
12- Fabrizio Barbazza
71- Steve Millen
3- Juan Manuel Fangio II
84- Albert Naon Jr.
6- Dave Simpson

Phoenix race
Held October 19 at Phoenix International Raceway. Jeff Andretti won the pole.

Top Five Results
12- Fabrizio Barbazza
3- Juan Manuel Fangio II
8- Billy Boat
85- Jeff Andretti
4- Davy Jones

Miami race
Held November 9 at Tamiami Park. Fabrizio Barbazza won the pole.

Top Five Results
12- Fabrizio Barbazza
3- Juan Manuel Fangio II
85- Jeff Andretti
84- Albert Naon Jr.
71- Steve Millen

Final points standings

Driver

For every race the points were awarded: 20 points to the winner, 16 for runner-up, 14 for third place, 12 for fourth place, 10 for fifth place, 8 for sixth place, 6 seventh place, winding down to 1 points for 12th place. Additional points were awarded to the pole winner (1 point) and to the driver leading the most laps (1 point).

Note:

Race 4 and 7 not all points were awarded (not enough competitors).

Complete Overview

R10=retired, but classified

Indy Lights seasons
American Racing Series Season, 1986
American